The English rock band Noel Gallagher's High Flying Birds have released three studio albums, one compilation album, four extended plays (EPs), one box set, twenty-one singles and thirteen music videos. Originally formed by eponymous frontman Noel Gallagher in 2010 following his departure from Oasis, the band released their self-titled debut album in October 2011. It topped the UK Albums Chart and has since sold over 820,000 copies in the UK. Noel Gallagher's High Flying Birds was supported by five singles, two of which reached the top 20 of the UK Singles Chart. B-sides from the first four of these were released in April 2012 as Songs from the Great White North...

A year after the release of their debut album, Noel Gallagher's High Flying Birds released the live video album International Magic Live at the O2, which documented the band's performance at The O2 Arena in February 2012. The album topped the UK Music Video Chart. The follow-up to the band's self-titled debut, Chasing Yesterday, was released in February 2015. The released once again topped the UK Albums Chart. The lead single from the album, "In the Heat of the Moment", reached number 26 on the UK Singles Chart, although later single releases have reached lower positions on the chart.

Albums

Studio albums

Compilation albums

Box sets

Extended plays

Singles

Promotional singles

Other charted songs

Videography

Video albums

Music videos

Notes

References

External links
Official website
Noel Gallagher's High Flying Birds at AllMusic
Noel Gallagher's High Flying Birds discography at Discogs
Noel Gallagher's High Flying Birds discography at MusicBrainz

Discography
Noel Gallagher's High Flying Birds
Noel Gallagher's High Flying Birds